Bjørn Larsson (18 October 1924 – 23 November 2021) was a Norwegian sport wrestler. He competed in the 1952 Summer Olympics, where he reached the second round. He represented the club IF Ørnulf. Larsson died on 23 November 2021, at the age of 97.

References

External links
 

1924 births
2021 deaths
Norwegian male sport wrestlers
Olympic wrestlers of Norway
Sportspeople from Oslo
Wrestlers at the 1952 Summer Olympics